Tiefensee is a surname. Notable people with the surname include:

Roger Tiefensee (born 1967), Swedish  politician
Siegfried Tiefensee (1922–2009), German musician and conductor
Wolfgang Tiefensee (born 1955), German politician